Robert Leon "Butch" Huskey (born November 10, 1971), is an American former professional baseball player who played in the major leagues primarily as an outfielder in 1993 and from 1995 to 2000.

Early life
Huskey was raised in Lawton, Oklahoma along with five brothers and three sisters. Because of his proximity to the Oklahoma City 89ers, he grew up a Texas Rangers fan. Huskey attended Eisenhower High School in Lawton where he played football and was an All-State tight end. He was offered a scholarship to play college football for Oklahoma.

1989–1993
Huskey was drafted by the New York Mets in the seventh round of the 1989 Major League Baseball Draft as a third baseman. That year he was awarded the Doubleday Award for the Rookie level Gulf Coast Mets in Sarasota, Florida. Huskey posted a batting average of .263, with six home runs, 34 runs batted in, and four stolen bases in 54 games. Huskey won a second Doubleday Award following the 1991 season, this time playing for the Columbia Mets of the South Atlantic League as he posted a batting average of .287, with 26 home runs, 99 runs batted in, and 22 stolen bases. He won the award along with José Martínez, a right-handed pitcher.

Huskey won the award again in 1993, for the Binghamton Mets of the Eastern League, posting a batting average of .251, with 25 home runs, 98 runs batted in, and 11 stolen bases. By this time, Huskey had been labeled a top prospect by the Mets. Because of this, in August, Huskey was recalled to debut against the Houston Astros, with Darryl Kile on the mound, on the day Kile threw a no-hitter. Huskey was again recalled on September 1, 1993, when rosters expanded. He finished the season in the majors, batting .146 with no home runs, three runs batted in, and no stolen bases. (The Columbia Mets did not become the Capital City Bombers until 1993)

1994–1996
Huskey played the entire 1994 campaign with the Norfolk Tides of the International League. It was possible he would have been recalled again in September, but his hopes were dashed by the 1994 Major League Baseball strike. Huskey rebounded in 1995, winning a fourth and final Doubleday Award, this time along with right-handed pitcher Jason Isringhausen. Spending the season with Norfolk, he posted a batting average of .284, with 28 home runs, 87 runs batted in, and eight stolen bases. For his performance he was awarded with a September call-up, though he failed to impress at the big league level again, batting .189 with three home runs, 11 runs batted in, and one stolen base.

In 1996, Huskey was primed to compete with backup infielder Edgardo Alfonzo for the starting position at third base for the New York Mets, following the trade of incumbent Bobby Bonilla to the Baltimore Orioles the previous season. However, the unexpected play of shortstop Rey Ordóñez prompted Dallas Green to alter the infield alignment: Ordonez was awarded the starting shortstop position, with José Vizcaíno shifting to second base, and Jeff Kent shifting to third base. To compensate both Huskey and eager Mets fans, he was awarded the starting right field job, a position he had only played once previously at the Major League level. Huskey struggled defensively in the outfield, soon finding himself being replaced by more athletic natural outfielders, such as Carl Everett and Alex Ochoa, as well as being berated on several radio talk shows for his excessive weight. However, Huskey soon found himself in a platoon role with first baseman Rico Brogna, a left-handed hitter. Huskey went on to be the Mets' busiest first baseman that year, finishing with a .278 average, 15 home runs, 60 runs batted in, and one stolen base.

1997–1998
1997 proved to be another tumultuous season for the young right-hander.  With incumbent third baseman Jeff Kent traded away, Huskey was awarded the opening day third baseman's job. However, Huskey again struggled defensively, and was benched in favor of Edgardo Alfonzo, who went on to have a breakout season. Huskey once again found himself in right field, this time to platoon with the struggling Carl Everett. This season proved to be his most successful, as he posted a batting average of .287, with 24 home runs, 81 runs batted in, and eight stolen bases. Huskey was only 25 years old, and some scouts compared him to Mark McGwire.  One highlight of Huskey's 1997 season came on September 15, when he hit a home run off Philadelphia Phillies pitcher Matt Beech that landed in section 638 of Veterans Stadium.  He became only the third player to hit a ball into the stadium's 600 level, following Willie Stargell and Rubén Rivera.  Jim Thome would be the only other player to reach the 600 level with a batted ball before the stadium closed following the 2003 season.

All hopes seemed lost following the 1998 season, as Huskey regressed offensively, posting a batting average of .252, with 13 home runs, 59 runs batted in, and seven stolen bases. Following the season General Manager Steve Phillips announced that he would explore more options in right field. On November 11, 1998, the Mets re-acquired Bobby Bonilla, from the Los Angeles Dodgers, this time to play right field, in exchange for pitcher Mel Rojas. On December 14, 1998, the Mets traded Huskey to the Seattle Mariners in exchange for pitcher Lesli Brea.

1999–2001
Huskey was expected to have a limited bench role with Seattle, but his bat (15 home runs in only 262 at-bats) earned him more and more playing time. While Seattle had no playoff hopes at midseason, several other teams still did, and were looking to bolster their rosters. One such team was the Boston Red Sox, who acquired Huskey on July 26, 1999, in exchange for Robert Ramsay. Huskey served as a right-handed complement to Boston's left-handed designated hitter, Brian Daubach.  Huskey performed well in Boston, hitting seven home runs down in the second half of the season in only 124 at-bats and helped the Red Sox to a wild card berth.  Following the season, Huskey signed a one-year contract with the Minnesota Twins on January 27, 2000.

Huskey was expected to have a breakout season in 2000 with Minnesota as the Twins' everyday designated hitter, but he struggled offensively, hitting only five home runs in 215 at-bats.  On July 15, 2000, he was traded with Todd Walker to the Colorado Rockies in exchange for Todd Sears and cash.  The Rockies were in a pennant race and looking for power off of their bench.  Huskey did not disappoint, hitting four home runs in only 92 at-bats while playing mostly left field. On January 26, 2001, Huskey signed a one-year contract with the Cleveland Indians but failed to make the team in Spring Training and subsequently retired at the age of 29, as his meteoric rise in New York, Seattle, and Boston was equaled by his sudden downfall in Minnesota. In 2006, Huskey participated in Mets' fantasy camps in Port St. Lucie, Florida prior to the 2006 season.

His number
As a Met, Huskey started out his career in 1993 wearing number 10, and then wore the number 42 for the rest of his Met career from 1995 to 1998 when Major League Baseball retired the number in honor of Jackie Robinson on April 15, 1997, in a game between the Mets and Los Angeles Dodgers at Shea Stadium. A grandfather clause enabled him to wear the number for the remainder of his career if he so chose; he changed his number to 44 with the Red Sox in 1999, then reverted to 42 with the Twins before finishing out his career with the Rockies wearing number 35.

In popular culture
Huskey is mentioned in the Yo La Tengo song "Moby Octopad" (from the 1997 album I Can Hear the Heart Beating as One).

Notes

External links

1971 births
Living people
People from Anadarko, Oklahoma
Norfolk Tides players
Major League Baseball outfielders
New York Mets players
Seattle Mariners players
Boston Red Sox players
Minnesota Twins players
Colorado Rockies players
Baseball players from Oklahoma
International League MVP award winners
Sportspeople from Lawton, Oklahoma
Binghamton Mets players
Colorado Springs Sky Sox players
Gulf Coast Mets players
Kingsport Mets players
Salt Lake Buzz players
St. Lucie Mets players
African-American baseball players
21st-century African-American sportspeople
20th-century African-American sportspeople